For members of the Belgian Federal Parliament (2003–2007), see:
List of members of the Chamber of Representatives of Belgium, 2003–2007
List of members of the Senate of Belgium, 2003–2007